Ilchester is an unincorporated community and census-designated place in Howard County, Maryland, United States. The population was 23,476 at the 2010 census. It was named after the village of Ilchester in the English county of Somerset.

History

The Ellicott family (John, Andrew, and Joseph Ellicott) settled in the area in the late 18th century, buying a two-mile section of the Patapsco in 1772 that included Ilchester and Ellicott Mills. The Baltimore and Ohio Railroad (B&O) was built up the Patapsco River valley through Ilchester in 1830 (see Old Main Line Subdivision), and George Ellicott, Jr. (grandson of Andrew) built a tavern and cooper shop along the railroad. The Thistle Manufacturing Company built a factory in 1837. Ilchester did not become a major stop for the B&O due to its steep grades, and the tavern was unsuccessful. In 1842, mail service was started with the station name "Illchester Mills".

Ellicott sold his tavern and 110 acres of land to a Redemptorist church order in 1866. The church used the Ellicott estate to start a college, initially called Mount Saint Clemens when it opened in 1868. Several additions to the original building were made, and a chapel was constructed.  In 1882 it was renamed Saint Mary's College. In 1893 the chapel was established as a parish church dedicated to "Our Lady of Perpetual Help".  The parish moved the church to a new facility in 1958. Enrollment at the college declined, and the college was closed in 1972.  The State of Maryland purchased a portion of the campus in 1987 and added the land to adjacent Patapsco Valley State Park.

In 1949, the Baltimore Council of the Girls Scouts purchased "Camp Ilchester", which has remained in operation to date as a girl scout camp.

Geography

Ilchester is located at  (39.2509, −76.7647). It is situated in Howard County, between Ellicott City to the northwest and Elkridge to the southeast. Columbia is to the southwest. The Patapsco River forms the northeast boundary of the community and serves as the county line, with Baltimore County and the community of Catonsville across the river.

The original mill community of Ilchester is located along the Patapsco River at the junction of Ilchester and Bonnie Branch Roads. However, the current CDP extends southwest to include the suburban terrain of Howard County outside of the Patapsco River valley. Maryland Route 103, Montgomery Road, is the main local road through the CDP. Maryland Route 100 is a freeway that runs through the southern part of Ilchester, serving the community at Exit 4 with Montgomery Road. To the south, Route 100 intersects with Interstate 95, which forms the southeastern boundary of the Ilchester CDP.

Demographics

See also
Ilchester Tunnel (B&O Railroad)

References

Census-designated places in Howard County, Maryland
Census-designated places in Maryland
Railway stations in the United States opened in 1830